IFS AB (Industrial and Financial Systems) is a multinational enterprise software company headquartered in Linköping, Sweden. The company develops and delivers enterprise software for customers worldwide who manufacture and distribute goods, maintain assets, and manage service-focused operations. IFS has over 5,000 employees that support thousands of customers worldwide from a network of local offices and a growing ecosystem of partners.

History

Early years (1983–1996) 
IFS was founded in 1983 in Sweden and launched its first software product IFS Maintenance in 1985. Five years later the complete product suite known as IFS Applications was launched. In the next several years saw IFS expanding its presence in the Scandinavian region with the establishment of offices in Norway, Finland, Denmark and then expanding outside Scandinavia into Poland. 1993, saw IFS introduced its first graphical user interface and expanded to Malaysia. In 1995, it expanded to North America.

Expansions (1996–2015) 
In 1996, IFS was listed in the Swedish stock exchange and the product was made into a component based one. This was followed with the launch of its web client and its establishment of an RnD center in Colombo. In 2001, IFS introduced Java-based mobile clients and Internet portals. In 2004, NEC acquired a 7.7% of IFS share capital. By 2005, IFS Applications had more than 500,000 users. In 2008, IFS launched its new GUI and began several acquisitions.

Investment by EQT (2015–) 
In 2015, IFS had reached more than one million global users and was acquired by EQT, a Swedish private equity group. IFS released its most recent ERP system, IFS Applications 10, in 2018 – the same year that Darren Roos was appointed as CEO, followed by IFS Field Service Management 6 in 2019. 

In July 2020, the EQT VII fund sold IFS AB to the successor funds EQT VIII and EQT IX, and global growth private equity firm, TA Associates, which became a minority partner at a transaction value in excess of US$3.3 million. In March 2022, IFS announced that Hg, a leading software and services investor, would become a significant minority shareholder in IFS and WorkWave. Long-term investor EQT remains the majority shareholder, with Hg and TA Associates as significant minority shareholders. The transaction values IFS and WorkWave at $10 billion and sets both companies up to further grow their position as leading players in growing sectors.

Operations 
IFS is governed by the company’s Executive Management Team, providing leadership and direction from a global, operational perspective. Strategically, the company has a four region focus, led by members of the Executive Management Team. These focus areas are; Southern & Western Europe, Northern & Central Europe, Americas and APJME&A.

Acquisitions

Philanthropy 
In 2015, IFS initiated the IFS Education Programme, focusing on inspiring more students to study beyond elementary school and to highlight the importance of STEM subjects. Partnerships with schools were based around lectures and teaching by IFS staff, donation of computer equipment, financial support through scholarships and grants, and free IFS software. In 2018, over 90 universities were part of the IFS Education Programme. IFS offers its employees one CSR day per year to use to volunteer in their local communities. In 2019, IFS employees volunteered 4624 hours of their time. Having been present in Sri Lanka for over 20 years, The IFS Foundation was created by IFS employees to give back to rural villages in Sri Lanka by improving living conditions. The trustees of the IFS Foundation have indicated that they plan to address healthcare, sanitation, education, access to clean water, and rural poverty. Key projects in 2019, focused on the provision of sanitation facilities, tube wells, and improvements to the local school.

Accolades 

IFS was selected winner of the European Digital Technology Award, out of 150,000 businesses from over 33 countries, in the 2019 European Business Awards 2019. In 2020, its CEO Darren Roos was awarded the ‘CEO of the Year 2020’ and IFS won bronze in the Transform Awards 2020. IFS received a 5-Star rating from CRN®, a brand of The Channel Company, in its 2020 Partner Program Guide.  The company has received the CSR Excellence Award for the IFS Education program alongside the CSR Award, both in 2019.

Recognitions for a variety of software solutions include:

 Leader by Gartner® Magic Quadrant™ for Field Service Management for the sixth consecutive year
 Leader in the Forrester Wave Enterprise Service Wave 2021 report 
 Leader in the 2021 IDC MarketScape for SaaS and Cloud-Enabled Manufacturing EAM Applications
 Leader in the 2021-2022 IDC MarketScape for Manufacturing Field Service Management Applications 
 Constellation ShortList™ for Field Service Management 
 Constellation ShortList™ for Product-Centric Cloud ERP

See also 
 List of ERP software packages

Notes

References 

Swedish brands
ERP software companies
Customer relationship management software companies
Companies established in 1983
Software companies of Sweden
Software companies of Sri Lanka
Companies based in Östergötland County